Nudi may refer to:
Nudi - means, Language; speech; talk in Kannada.
Nudi (software), a computer program to type in Kannada script.
Nudi (surname), a surname of Italian or Spanish descent
Nudi, Iran, a village in Ardabil Province, Iran